Eric Jon Engberg (September 18, 1941 – March 27, 2016) was an American correspondent who worked for CBS News from 1976 to 2003.

Life
Engberg attended Highland Park High School (Class of 1959) in Highland Park, Illinois.
He graduated from the University of Missouri School of Journalism.

He worked at WTOP-TV; WTOP-FM; WTOP-AM from 1968 to 1972, then moved to Group W from 1972 until he joined CBS in 1976.

Bernard Goldberg listed, as a central example of media bias, an Engberg CBS Evening News Reality Check segment that ridiculed the flat tax proposal of Steve Forbes.  Goldberg leveled this charge in his book, Bias: A CBS Insider Exposes How the Media Distort the News, and elsewhere.

Engberg wrote disparagingly of the candidates' performance in the 2000 presidential debates. He cautioned that anonymous sources are often misleading.

Engberg died at his home in Palmetto, Florida, on March 27, 2016.

Awards
During his career Engberg received several awards for his reporting, including 1998 Investigative Reporters and Editors award, and 1999 Alfred I. duPont–Columbia University Award silver baton award.

References

External links
Eric Engberg website

"Blogging As Typing, Not Journalism", CBS News, Dick Meyer, November 8, 2004
"Outside Voices: Eric Engberg Calls For A Time Out On Anonymous Sources", CBS News, Vaughn Ververs, November 11, 2005
"48 Hours with "48 Hours"", Entertainment Weekly'', Tim Appelo, March 23, 1990

1941 births
2016 deaths
Missouri School of Journalism alumni
CBS News people
People from Palmetto, Florida

People from Highland Park, Illinois 
People from Bethesda, Maryland